Eslamshahr (also romanized as Eslāmshahr), is a city in the Central District of Eslamshahr County, Tehran province, Iran, and serves as capital of the county. At the 2006 census, its population was 357,171 in 91,293 households. The following census in 2011 counted 389,102 people in 112,487 households. The latest census in 2016 showed a population of 448,129 people in 137,638 households.

The city has grown to be the most populous non-provincial capital city and the 19th overall most populous city of the country.

Etymology
The name of Eslamshahr before the Islamic revolution in Iran was "Shadshahr" and in 1979 the government changed it to "Eslamshahr".

History
The old, historic name of Bahramabad is now applied only to a small northern suburbs of Eslamshahr, or the "village of Bahramabad").

Geography
The city is located on the Saveh Road, which starts in the south of Tehran, and ends at Saveh City.

Its neighborhoods are Vavan, Ghaemieh, Saeedieh, Mohamadieh, Mahdieh, Baghenarde, Saloor, Noori, Ghasemabad, Shirudi, Golha, Elahiye, Ahmadabad, Ghods, Baghqfeiz, Zarafshan, Moosiabad, Anbia and Mianabad.

Climate
Eslamshahr has a cold semi-arid climate (Köppen BSk).

Transport
Eslamshahr is known for its handcrafted articles and its good weather. It also has Imam Khomeini International Airport within its city limits.

References

External links

Official Website 

Eslamshahr County

Cities in Tehran Province

Populated places in Tehran Province

Populated places in Eslamshahr County